William Torres may refer to:

 William Torres (footballer, born 1976), Salvadoran footballer
 William Torres (footballer, born 1981), Salvadoran footballer
 William Miranda Torres, Puerto Rican politician